Inipaco River is a river of Amapá state in north-eastern Brazil.

See also
List of rivers of Amapá

References
 Brazilian Ministry of Transport

Rivers of Amapá